Barton is a linear village and civil parish in the City of Preston, Lancashire, England. The parish had a population of 1,150, of whom 552 were male and 598 were female, according to the 2011 census.

Geography
The parish is bound by the A6 road to the west. A bridge carries the A6 over the West Coast Main Line railway north of the village hall. The M6 motorway also passes through the parish, splitting the village, west of the motorway, from the rest of the parish.

Barton Grange was built as the country residence for Mr John Healey, a local mill owner and was later the home of Levi Collison MP. In 1940 it was requisitioned by the War Office and is now a hotel.

There is a primary school, Barton St Lawrence CofE Primary School, on Jepps Avenue. The modern village hall is on the northern edge of the village.

Community
Barton is within the City of Preston electoral ward of Preston Rural North, and the Preston Rural electoral division of Lancashire County Council.

History
The parish church of St Lawrence was re-built in 1895 to a design by Richard Knill Freeman. It is a Grade II listed building. It is part of the Fellside Team of parishes.

The civil parish of Barton was part of Preston Rural District throughout its existence from 1894 to 1974. In 1974 the parish became part of the Borough of Preston, which became a city in 2002.

See also

Listed buildings in Barton, Preston

References

Gallery

External links

Villages in Lancashire
Geography of the City of Preston
Civil parishes in Lancashire